Compadres is a 2016 Mexican-American action comedy-drama film directed by Enrique Begne and co-written with Ted Perkins and Gabriel Ripstein. This film featured a cast of Mexican and American actors made up of Omar Chaparro, Aislinn Derbez, José Sefami, Erick Elías, Camila Sodi, Joaquín Cosío, Héctor Jimenez, Eric Roberts, Rip Torn, Joey Morgan and Kevin Pollak.

The film was released on March 31, 2016 in Mexico and on April 22, 2016 in the United States.

Plot
After being released from prison, former Mexican cop Diego Garza (Omar Chaparro) seeks revenge on Santos (Erick Elias). Santos has kidnapped his girlfriend María (Aislinn Derbez) and framed him for a crime he didn't commit. With the help of his former boss Coronado (José Sefami), Garza manages to escape with a tip about how to find Santos which leads him to San Diego in search of an "accountant." This said accountant is responsible for stealing $10 million from Santos and may know Santos' whereabouts. When Garza arrives, he is shocked to find that the infamous accountant is a 17 year old white American computer hacker named Vic (Joey Morgan). Despite an immediate disdain for each other, these two divided by culture, language and age, realize that Garza's low tech brain and Vic's high tech hacker skills may be their only chance at finding Santos before he finds them.

Cast
 Omar Chaparro as Diego Garza
 Aislinn Derbez as María
 José Sefami as Coronado
 Eric Roberts as Dalton
 Joey Morgan as Vic
 Erick Elías as Santos
 Héctor Jiménez as Guasa
 Rip Torn as "Tex", The Banker
 Camila Sodi as Emilia
 Evan Henderson as Dalton's Partner
 Joaquín Cosío
 Efren Ramirez as "El Payas"
 Kevin Pollak 
 Espinoza Paz
 Adrián Uribe

Music 
Omar Chaparro interprets the main song of the movie, Si hubiera sabido.

Release

Box office
Compadres opened theatrically in the United States from Pantelion Films on 22 April 2016 in 368 venues and earned $1,397,434 in its opening weekend, ranking ninth in the North American box office and second among the new releases. In Mexico, the film was released on 31 March and, as of 17 April, had grossed $4,225,771, bringing the film's worldwide total to $5,623,205.

Critical reception
The film received mixed to negative reviews from critics. On Rotten Tomatoes, it has a 40% approval score based on 15 reviews, with an average rating of 4.4/10. Metacritic reports a 28 out of 100 rating based on 5 critics, indicating "generally unfavorable reviews".

References

External links
 
 
 
 

2016 films
Films about Mexican Americans
2010s Spanish-language films
2010s action comedy-drama films
2016 independent films
Mexican action comedy-drama films
Mexican independent films
English-language Mexican films
2010s English-language films
2010s Mexican films